Collins Okothnyawallo (born 9 May 1973) is a Kenyan former weightlifter. He competed in the men's heavyweight I event at the 1996 Summer Olympics.

References

External links
 

1973 births
Living people
Kenyan male weightlifters
Olympic weightlifters of Kenya
Weightlifters at the 1996 Summer Olympics
Place of birth missing (living people)
Commonwealth Games medallists in weightlifting
Weightlifters at the 1994 Commonwealth Games
Commonwealth Games bronze medallists for Kenya
Medallists at the 1994 Commonwealth Games